This is a list of Private Passions episodes from 2010 to 2014. It does not include repeated episodes or compilations.

2010

2011

2012

2013

References

Lists of British radio series episodes